Sri Venkateswara Center Inc. (SV Center) is a Hindu temple located in Edina, Minnesota.

The principal deity worshipped is Venkateswara.

References

Buildings and structures in Edina, Minnesota
Hindu temples in Minnesota
Vishnu temples
Buildings and structures in Hennepin County, Minnesota
2009 establishments in Minnesota
Religious buildings and structures completed in 1997
Indian-American culture in Minnesota
Asian-American culture in Minnesota